Flame is the fourth studio album by American saxophonist Ronnie Laws released in September 1978 by United Artists Records. The album reached No. 16 on the Billboard Top Soul Albums chart.

Overview
Flame was executively produced by Wayne Henderson.

Tracklisting

Covers
Sylvia St. James recorded a vocal version of "Grace", with lyrics written by Roxanne Seeman, on her 1981 studio album Echoes & Images. 

Yves Tumor samples the Sylvia St. James version of "Grace", in his 2018 single Noid.

References

United Artists Records albums
Ronnie Laws albums
1978 albums
Albums produced by Wayne Henderson (musician)